"Let It Be" is a song by English electronic musician Labrinth. Written and produced with Gustave Rudman, the song was released on 28 September 2014.

Style and production
Speaking about the song to the Official Charts Company, Labrinth has stated that he was influenced by acts such as Electric Light Orchestra, Nina Simone, James Brown and John Barry when writing and recording "Let It Be", explaining that he "wanted to go gospel and soul and mix it with rock and electronic production" on the track.

The lyrical content of the song is said to be influenced by Labrinth's anxiety over his second album, with the artist offering the following overview of the track's origins:

Release
The debut of "Let It Be" took place in the form of a live performance by Labrinth and his band at Camden Market in London on 17 August 2014, after which the song debuted on radio the following day. On 19 August, the full song was released online. Upon its release, Labrinth explained that "I knew I had been gone a long time and needed to come back with a single that was special, something forward-thinking ... I wanted an opening statement to my second album and I put extra pressure on myself to come up with that".

Critical reception
Upon release, "Let It Be" received generally positive reception from critics. Writing for 4Music, reviewer Jessica Lever described the track as "fresh, catchy and upbeat". 4Music later called the song a "sexy new soul jam".

Idolator contributor Rachel Sonis explained that "While it might not be a party-starter like his Tinie Tempah-assisted club banger "Earthquake", ["Let It Be"] not only lets his sultry pipes shine through, but also shows a real maturation for the 25-year-old English crooner". Rachel Sonis of Idolator described the video as "dizzying" and "eerie", while a news story by radio station Kiss dubbed it "stripped back".

Music video
The music video for "Let It Be", directed by duo Us (Luke Taylor and Christopher Barrett), was released on 27 August 2014. Announcing its release, Lewis Corner of website Digital Spy described that the video "sees a single camera shot pan over various stages [of] the album creation process, with Labrinth at the piano, in the recording booth, being interviewed on TV and getting frustrated in a record label meeting". A behind the scenes video was also released documenting the creation process for the music video.

Charts

References

External links
Official music video on YouTube

2014 songs
2014 singles
Labrinth songs
Song recordings produced by Labrinth